Howard Brush Dean III (born November 17, 1948) is an American physician, author, consultant, and retired politician who served as the 79th governor of Vermont from 1991 to 2003 and chair of the Democratic National Committee (DNC) from 2005 to 2009. Dean was an unsuccessful candidate for the Democratic nomination in the 2004 presidential election. Later, his implementation of the fifty-state strategy as head of the DNC is credited with the Democratic victories in the 2006 and 2008 elections. Afterward, he became a political commentator and consultant to McKenna Long & Aldridge, a law and lobbying firm.

Before entering politics, Dean earned his medical degree from the Albert Einstein College of Medicine in 1978. Dean served as a member of the Vermont House of Representatives from 1983 to 1986 and as Lieutenant Governor of Vermont from 1987 to 1991. Both were part-time positions that enabled him to continue practicing medicine. In 1991, Dean became governor of Vermont when Richard A. Snelling died in office. Dean was subsequently elected to five two-year terms, serving from 1991 to 2003, making him the second longest-serving governor in Vermont history, after Thomas Chittenden (1778–1789 and 1790–1797). Dean served as chairman of the National Governors Association from 1994 to 1995; during his term, Vermont paid off much of its public debt and had a balanced budget 11 times, lowering income taxes twice. Dean also oversaw the expansion of the "Dr. Dynasaur" program, which ensures universal health care for children and pregnant women in the state. He is a noted staunch supporter of universal health care.

Dean denounced the 2003 invasion of Iraq and called on Democrats to oppose the Bush administration. In the 2004 election, initially seen as a long-shot candidate, Dean pioneered Internet-based fundraising and grassroots organizing, which is centered on mass appeal to small donors which is more cost efficient than the more expensive contacting of fewer potential larger donors, and promotes active participatory democracy among the general public. As a result of his unconventional strategy, he became the top fundraiser and front runner for the Democratic Party presidential nomination. Dean had a disappointing third-place finish in the Iowa caucus, and his campaign suffered after negative reactions in the media to a hoarse "Yeah" that he shouted after enumerating states that he hoped to win, and ending up losing the nomination to Senator John Kerry of Massachusetts.  In 2004, Dean founded Democracy for America, a progressive political action committee. He was later elected chairman of the Democratic National Committee in February 2005. As chairman of the party, Dean created and employed the 50 State Strategy that attempted to make Democrats competitive in normally conservative states often dismissed in the past as "solid red". The success of the strategy became apparent during the 2006 midterm elections, where Democrats took back control of the House and Senate, winning Senate seats from normally Republican states such as Missouri and Montana. In the 2008 election, the Democrats increased their House and Senate majorities, while Barack Obama used the 50 state strategy as the backbone of his successful presidential candidacy.

Dean was named chairman emeritus of the DNC upon his retirement in January 2009. Since retiring from the DNC chairman position, Dean has held neither elected office nor an official position in the Democratic Party and, was working for global law firm Dentons as part of the firm's public policy and regulation practice. In 2013, Dean expressed interest in running for the presidency in 2016, but instead supported former Secretary of State Hillary Clinton's run for president.

Early life and education

East Hampton and New York City childhood
Dean was born in East Hampton, New York, to Andrée Belden (née Maitland), an art appraiser, and Howard Brush Dean, Jr., an executive in the financial industry.
He is the eldest of four brothers, including Jim Dean, Chair of Democracy for America, and Charles Dean, who was captured by the Pathet Lao and executed by the North Vietnamese while traveling through Southeast Asia in 1974.

Howard's father worked at the stock brokerage firm of Dean Witter. The family was quite wealthy, Republican, and belonged to the exclusive Maidstone Golf Club in East Hampton. As a child, he spent much of his time growing up in East Hampton; the family built a house on Hook Pond there in the mid-1950s. While in New York, the family had a three-bedroom apartment on the Upper East Side along Park Avenue.

Howard attended the Browning School in Manhattan until he was 13, and then went to St. George's School, a preparatory school in Middletown, Rhode Island.
In September 1966, he attended Felsted School, UK, for one school year after winning an English Speaking Union scholarship.

UPI quoted one of Dean's friends in his youth as saying, "By Hamptons standards, the Deans were not rich. No safaris in Africa or chalets in Switzerland. Howard's father went to work every day. He didn't own a company, or have a father or grandfather who founded one, as mine did." Peggy Noonan wrote in the Wall Street Journal that

he doesn't seem like a WASP. I know it's not nice to deal in stereotypes, but there seems very little Thurston Howell, III, or George Bush, the elder, for that matter, in Mr. Dean. ... He seems unpolished, doesn't hide his aggression, is proudly pugnacious. He doesn't look or act the part of the WASP ... It will be harder for Republicans to tag Mr. Dean as Son of the Maidstone Club than it was for Democrats to tag Bush One as Heir to Greenwich Country Day. He just doesn't act the part.

Yale University
Dean graduated from Yale University with a Bachelor of Arts in political science in 1971. As a freshman, he requested specifically to room with an African-American. The university housing office complied and Dean roomed with two Southern black students and one white student from Pennsylvania. One of Dean's roommates was Ralph Dawson, the son of a sheet metal worker in Charleston, South Carolina, and today a New York City labor lawyer. Dawson said of Dean:

Though eventually eligible to be drafted into the military, he received a medical deferment because of an unfused vertebra. In response to Tim Russert asking on Meet the Press whether Dean could have served in the military had he not mentioned his back condition during his draft physical, Dean replied "I guess that's probably true. I mean, I was in no hurry to get into the military." He briefly tried a career as a stockbroker before deciding on a career in medicine, completing pre-medicine classes at Columbia University. In 1974, Dean's younger brother Charlie, who had been traveling through southeast Asia at the time, was captured and killed by Laotian guerrillas, a tragedy widely reported to have an enormous influence in Dean's life; for many years he has worn his brother's belt nearly every day as a memento.

Vermont medical practice
Dean received his medical degree from the Albert Einstein College of Medicine of Yeshiva University in 1978 and began a medical residency at the University of Vermont. In 1981, he married fellow doctor Judith Steinberg, whom he met in medical school, and together they began a family medical practice in Shelburne, Vermont (where she continued to use her maiden name to avoid confusion).

Religion
Although raised as an Episcopalian, Dean joined the Congregational church in 1982 after a negotiation with the local Episcopal diocese over a bike trail. By his own account, he does not attend church; at one point, when asked to name his favorite book in the New Testament, he offered the Old Testament Book of Job, then corrected himself an hour later. Dean has stated he is more "spiritual" than religious. He and his Jewish wife Judith Steinberg Dean have raised their two children, Anne and Paul, in a secular education, and both children self-identify as Jews.

Vermont political career
In 1980, Dean spearheaded a grassroots campaign to stop a condominium development on Lake Champlain, instead favoring the construction of a bicycle trail. The effort succeeded, and helped launch his political career. That same year, he was also a volunteer for Jimmy Carter's re-election campaign. In 1980, he was a Carter delegate at the Democratic National Convention. In 1981 he was elected chairman of the Chittenden County Democratic Committee. He served in this position until resigning in May 1984.

In 1982, he was elected to the Vermont House of Representatives; he was reelected in 1984 and became assistant minority leader. He was elected lieutenant governor in 1988 and reelected in 1990. Both were part-time positions, and Dean continued to practice medicine alongside his wife until he became governor.

On August 13, 1991, Dean was examining a patient when he received word that governor Richard A. Snelling had died of sudden cardiac arrest. Dean assumed the office, which he called the "greatest job in Vermont." He was subsequently elected to five two-year terms in his own right, making him the longest-serving governor in the state's history. From 1994 to 1995, Dean was the chairman of the National Governors Association.

Dean was faced with an economic recession and a $60 million budget deficit. He bucked many in his own party to immediately push for a balanced budget, an act which marked the beginning of a record of fiscal restraint. During his tenure as governor, the state paid off much of its debt, balanced its budget eleven times, raised its bond rating, and lowered income taxes twice. Robert Dreyfuss wrote that as a fiscal conservative,

Dean also focused on health care issues, most notably through the "Dr. Dynasaur" program, which ensures near-universal health coverage for children and pregnant women in the state; the uninsured rate in Vermont fell from 10.8 percent in 1993 to 8.4 percent in 2000 under his watch. Child abuse and teen pregnancy rates were cut roughly in half.

The first decision of his career to draw significant national attention came in 2000, after the Vermont Supreme Court, in Baker v. State, ruled that the state's marriage laws unconstitutionally excluded same-sex couples and ordered that the state legislature either allow gays and lesbians to marry or create a parallel status. Facing calls to amend the state constitution to prohibit either option, Dean chose to support the latter one, and signed the nation's first civil unions legislation into law, spurring a short-lived "Take Back Vermont" movement which helped Republicans gain control of the State House.

Dean was criticized during his 2004 presidential campaign for another decision related to civil unions. Shortly before leaving office, he had some of his Vermont papers sealed for at least the next decade, a time frame longer than most outgoing governors use, stating that he was protecting the privacy of many gay supporters who sent him personal letters about the issue. On the campaign trail, he demanded that Vice President Dick Cheney release his energy committee papers. Many people, including Democratic Senator and failed 2004 presidential candidate Joe Lieberman of Connecticut, who left the party after losing his primary for re-election in 2006, accused Dean of hypocrisy. Judicial Watch filed a lawsuit to force the papers be opened before the seal expired, but lost.

2004 presidential candidacy

Dean began his bid for president as a "long shot" candidate. ABC News ranked him eighth out of 12 in a list of potential presidential contenders in May 2002. In March 2003 he gave a speech strongly critical of the Democratic leadership at the California State Democratic Convention that attracted the attention of grassroots party activists and set the tone and the agenda of his candidacy. It began with the line: "What I want to know is what in the world so many Democrats are doing supporting the President's unilateral intervention in Iraq?"

That summer, his campaign was featured as the cover article in The New Republic and in the following months he received expanded media attention. His campaign slowly gained steam, and by autumn of 2003, Dean had become the apparent frontrunner for the Democratic nomination, performing strongly in most polls and outpacing his rivals in fundraising. This latter feat was attributed mainly to his innovative embrace of the Internet for campaigning, using Meetup.com to track supporters and encourage grassroots participation in the campaign. The majority of his donations came from individual Dean supporters, who came to be known as Deanites, or, more commonly, Deaniacs, a term coined to describe meetup participants, who passed out campaign materials supporting Dean and the broader movement. (Critics often labeled them "Deany Boppers", or "Deanie Babies", a reference to his support from young activists.) Following Dean's presidential campaign, some Deaniacs remained engaged in the political process through Democracy for America and similar locally oriented organizations.

Message and themes
Dean began his campaign by emphasizing health care and fiscal responsibility, and championing grassroots fundraising as a way to fight lobby groups. However, his opposition to the U.S. plan to invade Iraq (and his forceful criticism of Democrats in Congress who voted to authorize the use of force) quickly eclipsed other issues. By challenging the war in Iraq at a time when mainstream Democratic leaders were either neutral or cautiously supportive, Dean positioned himself to appeal to his party's activist base. Dean often quoted the late Minnesota Senator Paul Wellstone (who had recently died in a plane crash) as saying that he represented "the Democratic wing of the Democratic Party." His message resonated among frustrated Democratic primary voters who felt that their party hadn't done enough to oppose the policies of the Republicans. Thus, Dean also succeeded in differentiating himself from his primary opponents.

Dean's approach organizationally was also novel. His campaign made extensive use of the Internet, pioneering techniques that were subsequently adopted by politicians of all political persuasions. His supporters organized real-world meetings, many of them arranged through Meetup.com, participated in online forums, donated money online, canvassed for advertising ideas, and distributed political talking points. In terms of money, publicity and activism, Dean therefore quickly staked out a leadership position in the field of candidates. In this way, he was able to bypass existing party and activist infrastructure and built his own online network of supporters. In terms of traditional "ground troops", however, Dean remained at a disadvantage. Dean adopted a coffee shop strategy to visit grassroot activists in all 99 Iowa counties, but he lacked the campaign infrastructure to get voters to the polls that his opponents had.

Fundraising
In the "Invisible Primary" of raising campaign funds, Howard Dean led the Democratic pack in the early stages of the 2004 campaign. Among the candidates, he ranked first in total raised ($25.4 million as of September 30, 2003) and first in cash-on-hand ($12.4 million). However, even this performance paled next to that of George W. Bush, who by that date had raised $84.6 million for the Republican primary campaign, in which he had no strong challenger. Prior to the 2004 primary season, the Democratic record for most money raised in one quarter by a primary candidate was held by Bill Clinton in 1995, raising $10.3 million during a campaign in which he had no primary opponent. In the third quarter of 2003, the Dean campaign raised $14.8 million, shattering Clinton's record. All told, Dean's campaign raised around $50 million.

While presidential campaigns have traditionally obtained finance by tapping wealthy, established political donors, Dean's funds came largely in small donations over the Internet; the average overall donation was just under $80. This method of fundraising offered several important advantages over traditional fundraising, in addition to the inherent media interest in what was then a novelty. First, raising money on the Internet was relatively inexpensive, compared to conventional methods such as events, telemarketing, and direct mail campaigns. Secondly, as donors on average contributed far less than the legal limit ($2,000 per person), the campaign could continue to resolicit them throughout the election season.

Dean's director of grassroots fundraising, Larry Biddle, came up with the idea of the popular fundraising "bat", an image of a cartoon baseball player and bat which appeared on the site every time the campaign launched a fundraising challenge. The bat encouraged Web site visitors to contribute money immediately through their credit cards. This would lead to the bat filling up like a thermometer with the red color indicating the total funds. The site often took suggestions from the netroots on their blog. One of these suggestions led to one of the campaign's biggest accomplishments– an image of Dean eating a turkey sandwich encouraged supporters to donate $250,000 in three days to match a big-donor dinner by Vice President Dick Cheney. The online contributions from that day matched what Cheney made from his fundraiser.

In November 2003, after a much-publicized online vote among his followers, Dean became the first Democrat to forgo federal matching funds (and the spending limits that go with them) since the system was established in 1974. (John Kerry later followed his lead.) In addition to state-by-state spending limits for the primaries, the system limits a candidate to spending only $44.6 million until the Democratic National Convention in July, which sum would almost certainly run out soon after the early primary season. (George W. Bush declined federal matching funds in 2000 and did so again for the 2004 campaign.)

In a sign that the Dean campaign was starting to think beyond the primaries, they began in late 2003 to speak of a "$100 revolution" in which two million Americans would give $100 in order to compete with Bush.

Political commentators have stated that the fundraising of Barack Obama, with its emphasis on small donors and the internet, refined and built upon the model that Dean's campaign pioneered.

Endorsements

Though Dean lagged in early endorsements, he acquired many critical ones as his campaign snowballed. By the time of the Iowa caucuses, he led among commitments from superdelegates– elected officials and party officers entitled to convention votes by virtue of their positions. On November 12, 2003, he received the endorsements of the Service Employees International Union and the American Federation of State, County and Municipal Employees. Dean received the endorsement of former vice president and 2000 presidential candidate Al Gore, on December 9, 2003. In the following weeks Dean was endorsed by former U.S. senators Bill Bradley and Carol Moseley Braun, unsuccessful Democratic presidential candidates from the 2000 and 2004 primaries, respectively.

Other high-profile endorsers included:
 Governors (and former governors) Bruce Babbitt, Lowell P. Weicker, Jr., Jim McGreevey, Toney Anaya, Ann Richards
 Senators (and former Senators) Tom Harkin, Fred R. Harris, Howard Metzenbaum, Jim Jeffords, Patrick Leahy
 Representatives (and former Representatives) Jesse Jackson, Jr., John Conyers, Major Owens, Sheila Jackson Lee
 Former Baltimore Mayor (and former governor of Maryland) Martin J. O'Malley
 Dean also won the backing of lesser-known political figures, such as former Indiana State Senator and 1984 gubernatorial nominee Wayne Townsend.
 Timothy Kraft, a New Mexico political consultant who had been Jimmy Carter's 1980 campaign manager, came to Vermont to campaign for Dean.

Several celebrities from the entertainment industry endorsed him: Joan Jett, Martin Sheen, Rob Reiner, Susan Sarandon, Paul Newman, Robin Williams, and Joseph Gordon-Levitt.

Response
Many pundits blamed such endorsements for the campaign's eventual collapse. In particular, Al Gore's early endorsement of Dean weeks before the first primary of the election cycle was severely criticized by eight Democratic contenders particularly since he did not endorse his former running mate, Joe Lieberman. Gore supported Dean over Lieberman due to their differing opinions on Iraq which began to develop around 2002 (Lieberman supported the war and Gore did not). When Dean's campaign failed, some blamed Gore's early endorsement.

Iowa Caucus setback and the "Dean Scream" media gaffe

On January 19, 2004, Dean's rivals John Kerry and John Edwards pushed him into a third-place finish in the 2004 Iowa Democratic caucuses, representing the first votes cast in primary season. Dean's loud outburst in his public address that night was widely rebroadcast and portrayed as a media gaffe that ended his campaign.

According to a Newsday editorial written by Verne Gay, some members of the television audience criticized the speech as loud, peculiar, and unpresidential. In particular, this quote from the speech was aired repeatedly in the days following the caucus:

Senator Harkin was on stage with Dean, holding his suit jacket. This final "Yeah!" with its unusual tone that Dean later said was due to the cracking of his hoarse voice, has become known in American political jargon as the "Dean Scream" or the "I Have a Scream" speech. Comedians and late-night comedy show hosts such as Dave Chappelle and Conan O'Brien satirized, mocked, and popularized the sound bite, beginning a media onslaught that many believe contributed immensely to his poor showing in the subsequent races.

Dean conceded that the speech did not project the best image, jokingly referring to it as a "crazy, red-faced rant" on the Late Show with David Letterman. In an interview later that week with Diane Sawyer, he said he was "a little sheepish ... but I'm not apologetic."  Sawyer and many others in the national broadcast news media later expressed some regret about overplaying the story. CNN issued a public apology and admitted in a statement that they might have "overplayed" the incident. The incessant replaying of the "Dean Scream" by the press became a debate on the topic of whether Dean was the victim of media bias. The scream scene was shown an estimated 633 times by cable and broadcast news networks in just four days following the incident, a number that does not include talk shows and local news broadcasts. Some in the audience that day reported that they were unaware of the "scream" until they saw it on TV.  Dean said after the general election in 2004, that his microphone only picked up his voice and did not also capture the loud cheering he received from the audience as a result of the speech. On January 27, Dean finished second to Kerry in the New Hampshire primary. As late as one week before the first votes were cast in Iowa's caucuses, Dean had enjoyed a 30% lead in New Hampshire opinion polls; accordingly, this loss represented another major setback to his campaign.

Iowa and New Hampshire were the first in a string of losses for the Dean campaign, culminating in a third place showing in the Wisconsin primary on February 17. Two days before the Wisconsin primary, campaign advisor Steve Grossman announced through an article written by The New York Times Dean campaign correspondent Jodi Wilgoren that he would offer his services to any of the other major candidates "should Dean not win in Wisconsin."  This scoop further undermined Dean's campaign. Grossman later issued a public apology. The next day, Dean announced that his candidacy had "come to an end", though he continued to urge people to vote for him, so that Dean delegates would be selected for the convention and could influence the party platform. He later won the Vermont primary on Super Tuesday, March 2. This latter victory, a surprise even to Dean, was due in part to the lack of a serious anti-Kerry candidate in Vermont (John Edwards had declined to put his name on the state's ballot, expecting Dean to win in a landslide), and in part to a television ad produced, funded, and aired in Vermont by grassroots Dean supporters.

Impact
The New York Observer attributed Barack Obama's success in the 2008 presidential election to his perfection of the Internet organizing model that Dean pioneered.

On October 11, 2007, it was reported that Leonardo DiCaprio and George Clooney were in early talks about making a "political thriller" based on Howard Dean's 2004 campaign, tentatively titled Farragut North. The movie, finally titled The Ides of March, was released on October 7, 2011. It is based on the play Farragut North, which was named after the Washington Metro station located in the center of the lobbyist district. The play was written by Beau Willimon, a staffer on the Dean campaign. The main character is based on a former press secretary for the Dean campaign.

In November 2008, a documentary film about Dean and his campaign, Dean and Me, was released and shown at several film festivals around the country.

Post-campaign and Democracy for America

Following Dean's withdrawal after the Wisconsin primary, he pledged to support the eventual Democratic nominee. He remained neutral until John Kerry became the presumptive nominee. Dean endorsed Kerry on March 25, 2004, in a speech at The George Washington University in Washington, D.C.

On March 18, 2004, Dean founded the group Democracy for America. This group was created to house the large, Internet-based organization Dean created for his presidential campaign. Its goal is to help like-minded candidates get elected to local, state, and federal offices. It has endorsed several sets of twelve candidates known as the Dean Dozen. Dean turned over control of the organization to his brother, Jim Dean, when he became Chairman of the Democratic National Committee.

Dean strongly urged his supporters to support Kerry as opposed to Ralph Nader, arguing that a vote for Nader would only help to re-elect President George W. Bush because he believed that most who vote for Nader are likely to have voted for Kerry if Ralph Nader was not running. Dean argued that Nader would be more effective if he lobbied on election law reform issues during his campaign. Dean supported several election law reform issues such as campaign finance reform, and Instant Runoff Voting.

DNC Chairmanship

Dean was elected Chairman of the Democratic National Committee (DNC) on February 12, 2005, after all his opponents dropped out of the race when it became apparent Dean had the votes to become Chair. Those opponents included former Congressman Martin Frost, former Denver Mayor Wellington Webb, former Congressman and 9/11 Commissioner Tim Roemer, and strategists Donnie Fowler, David Leland, and Simon Rosenberg.

Many prominent Democrats opposed Dean's campaign; House Leader Nancy Pelosi and Senate Leader Harry Reid are rumored to be among them. Dean satisfied his critics by promising to focus on fundraising and campaigning as DNC Chair, and avoid policy statements. He was succeeded by Tim Kaine, who at the time of his election was the governor of Virginia, in 2009.

Dean ran for the position a second time in 2016. Two days after Hillary Clinton's defeat in the 2016 presidential election, he announced that he would again seek the chairmanship. There were other contenders at the time who had been endorsed by Senator Bernie Sanders of Vermont, and Senate Minority Leader-elect Chuck Schumer of New York.  On December 2, 2016, Dean withdrew his candidacy.

During his 2005-9 tenure, he promoted a "fifty-state strategy" and developed innovative fund-raising strategies.

Fifty-state strategy

After Dean became Chairman of the DNC, he pledged to bring reform to the Party. Rather than focusing just on swing states, Dean proposed what has come to be known as the 50-State Strategy, the goal of which was for the Democratic Party to be committed to winning elections at every level in every region of the country, with Democrats organized in every single voting precinct. State party chairs lauded Dean for raising money directly for the individual state parties.

Dean's strategy used a post-Watergate model taken from the Republicans of the mid-seventies. Working at the local, state and national level, the GOP built the party from the ground up. Dean's plan was to seed the local level with young and committed candidates, building them into state candidates in future races. Dean traveled extensively throughout the country with the plan, including places like Utah, Mississippi, and Texas, states in which Republicans had dominated the political landscape. Many establishment Democrats were at least initially dubious about the strategy's worth—political consultant and former Bill Clinton advisor, Paul Begala, suggested that Dean's plan was "just hiring a bunch of staff people to wander around Utah and Mississippi and pick their nose." Further changes were made in attempting to make the stated platform of the Democratic Party more coherent and compact. Overhauling the website, the official platform of the 2004 campaign, which was largely criticized as avoiding key issues and being the product of party insiders, was replaced with a simplified, though comprehensive categorizing of positions on a wide range of issues.

Dean's strategy arguably paid off in a historic victory as the Democrats took over control of the House of Representatives and the Senate in the 2006 mid-term elections. While it is likely this is also attributable to the shortcomings of the Republican Party in their dealings with the Iraq War and the scandals that occurred shortly before the election, Dean's emphasis on connecting with socially conservative, economic moderates in Republican-dominated states appears to have made some impact. Indeed, Democratic candidates won elections in such red states as Kansas, Indiana, and Montana. And while former Clinton strategist James Carville criticized Dean's efforts, saying more seats could have been won with the traditional plan of piling money solely into close races, the results and the strategy were met with tremendous approval by the party's executive committee in its December 2006 meeting. While he was chairman of the DCCC, Rahm Emanuel was known to have had disagreements over election strategy with Dean; Emanuel believed a more tactical approach, focusing attention on key districts, was necessary to ensure victory. Emanuel himself was criticised for his failure to support some progressive candidates, as Dean advocated.

The 50-state strategy relied on the idea that building the Democratic Party is at once an incremental election by election process as well as a long-term vision in party building. Democrats cannot compete in counties in which they do not field candidates. Therefore, candidate recruitment emerged as a component element of the 50-state strategy.

To build the party, the DNC under Dean worked in partnership with state Democratic parties in bringing the resources of the DNC to bear in electoral efforts, voter registration, candidate recruitment, and other interlocking component elements of party building. Decentralization was also a core component of the party's approach. The idea was that each state party had unique needs, but could improve upon its efforts through the distribution of resources from the national party.

The 50-state strategy was acknowledged by political commentators as an important factor in allowing Barack Obama to compete against John McCain in traditionally red states, during the 2008 presidential contest. In 2008, Obama won several states that had previously been considered Republican strongholds, most notably Indiana, North Carolina, and Virginia.

Fundraising strategies
Through grassroots fundraising, Howard Dean was able to raise millions more than the previous DNC Chairman at the same point after the 2000 election. The year after his election, Dean had raised the most money by any DNC Chairman in a similar post election period. This was especially apparent when the Federal Election Commission reported that the DNC had raised roughly $86.3 million in the first six months of 2005, an increase of over 50% on the amount raised during the same period of 2003. In comparison, the RNC fundraising activities represented a gain of only 2%. Additional attempts to capitalize on this trend was the introduction of "Democracy Bonds," a program under which small donors would give a set amount every month. Although it only reached over 31,000 donors by May 2006, far off-pace from the stated goal of 1 million by 2008, it nonetheless contributed to a new small-donor funding philosophy of the DNC. Dean continued to further develop online fundraising at the DNC. Just one month before Election Day 2006, he became the first to introduce the concept of a "grassroots match," where donors to the DNC pledged to match the first donation made by a new contributor. The DNC stated that the resulting flood of contributions led to 10,000 first-time donors in just a few days.

Post-DNC career

Political involvement

Potential Obama administration role 
Supporters of Dean were angry that he was not given a position in the new Obama administration and not invited to the press conference at which Tim Kaine was introduced as his successor as Democratic National Committee chairman. Joe Trippi, who was Dean's presidential campaign manager in 2004, told Politico, "[Dean] was never afraid to challenge the way party establishment in Washington did business, and that doesn't win you friends in either party." Trippi further explained the apparent snub of Dean by stating, "You don't have to look any further than Rahm Emanuel." Trippi was referring to the tension between Emanuel and Dean over Dean's 50 state strategy. Sources close to Emanuel dismissed these charges.

Dean said: "I didn't do this for the spoils. I did this for the country. I'm very happy that Barack Obama is president, and I think he's picked a great Cabinet. And I'm pretty happy. I wouldn't trade my position for any other position right now. I'm going to go into the private sector, make a living making speeches, and do a lot of stuff on health care policy."

When asked about not being selected for a position in the Obama administration, Dean responded, "Obviously, it would have been great, but it's not happening and the president has the right to name his own Cabinet, so I'm not going to work in the government it looks like." When asked how he felt about not being selected, Dean replied he would "punt on that one."

After the withdrawal of Tom Daschle's nomination for the position, Dean had been touted by many for the post of Secretary of Health and Human Services. After being passed over for the post once again, Dean commented: "I was pretty clear that I would have liked to have been Secretary of HHS but it is the president's choice and he decided to go in a different direction."

UK politics 
Outside the US Dean is a supporter of the Liberal Democrats party of the United Kingdom. He has close links with the party and has spoken at their party conference in the past. Since the UK began the Brexit process he has continued to tweet his support for the party.

People's Mujahedin of Iran 
After leaving office Dean emerged as a major supporter of the People's Mujahedin of Iran (Mujahedeen-e-Khalq, or MEK), calling for it to be delisted as a terrorist group by the United States, which occurred on September 21, 2012.

2016 presidential election 
Dean endorsed Hillary Clinton during the 2016 presidential election instead of Vermont Senator Bernie Sanders from his home state in September 2015.

Dean questioned on Twitter whether Donald Trump's sniffing during a presidential debate was due to cocaine use, and later apologized for "using innuendo."

Private sector 
In a January 2009 interview with the Associated Press, Dean indicated he would enter the private sector after 30 years in politics. Dean told the AP he would deliver speeches and share ideas about campaigns and technology with center-left political parties around the world. He became a contributor to the news network MSNBC in shows such as The Last Word with Lawrence O'Donnell. He has also guest hosted Countdown with Keith Olbermann and The Rachel Maddow Show. He is on the board of the National Democratic Institute.

Dean also serves as a Senior Presidential Fellow at Hofstra University. He has been a Senior Fellow at the Yale Jackson Institute for Global Affairs and a visiting professor at Williams College. He been a Senior Strategic Advisor and Independent Consultant for the Government Affairs practice at McKenna, Long & Aldridge. In December 2018 Dean joined the advisory board of Tilray, one of the world's largest cannabis companies. As of 2021 he worked in the lobbying division of Dentons where he has lobbied against waiving intellectual property requirements for the COVID-19 vaccine for developing countries. Dean is a member of the Canadian American Business Council's Advisory Board.

Electoral history

References

Further reading
 Dean, Howard. Howard Dean's Prescription for Real Healthcare Reform. Chelsea Green Publishing, 2009. .
 Dean, Howard. You Have the Power: How to Take Back Our Country and Restore Democracy in America. Simon & Schuster, 2004. .
 Dean, Howard. Winning Back America. Simon & Schuster, 2003. .
 Dunnan, Dana. Burning at the Grassroots: Inside the Dean Machine. Pagefree (vanity press), 2004. .
 Trippi, Joe. The Revolution Will Not Be Televised. ReganBooks, 2004. .
 Van Susteren, Dirk. Howard Dean: A Citizen's Guide to the Man Who Would Be President. Steerforth, 2003. .

External links

 Professional biography of Howard Dean
 

|-

|-

|-

|-

|-

|-

|-

 
1948 births
1992 United States presidential electors
21st-century American politicians
Albert Einstein College of Medicine alumni
American stockbrokers
Browning School alumni
Businesspeople in the cannabis industry
Candidates in the 2004 United States presidential election
Columbia University alumni
Democratic National Committee chairs
Democratic Party governors of Vermont
Internet-based activism
Left-wing populism in the United States
Lieutenant Governors of Vermont
Living people
Democratic Party members of the Vermont House of Representatives
People from East Hampton (town), New York
Physicians from Vermont
Politicians from Burlington, Vermont
St. George's School (Rhode Island) alumni
Yale College alumni